Minuscule 426 (in the Gregory-Aland numbering), Νλ49 (in the Soden numbering), is a Greek minuscule manuscript of the New Testament, on cotton paper. Palaeographically it has been assigned to the 14th century.

Description 

The codex contains only the text of the Gospel of Luke 6:17-11:28 on 208 paper leaves. It is written in one column per page, in 26 lines per page. The biblical text is surrounded by Nicetas' catena.

Text 

The Greek text of the codex is a representative of the Byzantine text-type. Aland placed it in Category V.
It was not examined by the Claremont Profile Method.

History 

The manuscript was added to the list of New Testament manuscripts by Scholz (1794–1852). 
C. R. Gregory saw it in 1887.

Formerly the manuscript was held in Augsburg. It is currently housed at the Bavarian State Library (Gr. 473) in Munich.

See also 

 List of New Testament minuscules
 Biblical manuscript
 Textual criticism
 Minuscule 427

References

Further reading 

 

Greek New Testament minuscules
14th-century biblical manuscripts